Washington County is a county located in the U.S. state of Mississippi. As of the 2020 census, the population was 44,922. Its county seat is Greenville. The county is named in honor of the first president of the United States, George Washington. It is located to the Arkansas border.

The Greenville, MS Micropolitan Statistical Area includes all of Washington County. It is located in the Mississippi Delta.

History

Located in the Mississippi Delta, Washington County was first developed for cotton cultivation in the antebellum years. Most plantations were developed to have access to the rivers, which were the major transportation routes. Cotton was based on slave labor. 

In an 1860 Census, Washington County had an enslaved population of 92.3%, the second-highest anywhere in the country, only behind Issaquena County, Mississippi (92.5%). In the period from 1877 to 1950, Washington County had 12 documented lynchings of African Americans. Most occurred around the turn of the 20th century, as part of white imposition of Jim Crow conditions and suppression of black voting.

Geography

Adjacent counties
 Bolivar County (north)
 Sunflower County (northeast)
 Humphreys County (east)
 Sharkey County (southeast)
 Issaquena County (south)
 Chicot County, Arkansas (west)
 Desha County, Arkansas (northwest)

National protected areas
 Holt Collier National Wildlife Refuge
 Theodore Roosevelt National Wildlife Refuge (part)
 Yazoo National Wildlife Refuge

Demographics

2020 census

As of the 2020 United States Census, there were 44,922 people, 17,988 households, and 11,232 families residing in the county.

2010 census
As of the 2010 United States Census, there were 51,137 people living in the county. 71.3% were Black or African American, 27.0% White, 0.6% Asian, 0.1% Native American, 0.4% of some other race and 0.6% of two or more races. 1.0% were Hispanic or Latino (of any race).

2000 census
As of the census of 2000, there were 62,977 people, 22,158 households, and 15,931 families living in the county.  The population density was 87 people per square mile (34/km2).  There were 24,381 housing units at an average density of 34 per square mile (13/km2).  The racial makeup of the county was 69.57% Black or African American, 33.97% White, 0.09% Native American, 0.53% Asian, 0.02% Pacific Islander, 0.25% from other races, and 0.57% from two or more races.  0.84% of the population were Hispanic or Latino of any race.

According to the census of 2000, the largest ancestry groups in Washington County were African 69.57%, English 21.4%, Scottish 8.2% and Scots-Irish 3.1%

Washington County by 2005 was 67.2% African-American in population.  Latinos constituted 1.1% of the population in the county while non-Hispanic whites made up 31.7% of the population.

As of the census of 2000, there were 22,158 households, out of which 36.30% had children under the age of 18 living with them, 40.60% were married couples living together, 26.00% had a female householder with no husband present, and 28.10% were non-families. 24.60% of all households were made up of individuals, and 10.00% had someone living alone who was 65 years of age or older.  The average household size was 2.80 and the average family size was 3.35.

In the county, the population was spread out, with 31.50% under the age of 18, 10.10% from 18 to 24, 26.50% from 25 to 44, 20.50% from 45 to 64, and 11.50% who were 65 years of age or older.  The median age was 32 years. For every 100 females there were 87.70 males.  For every 100 females age 18 and over, there were 80.30 males.

The median income for a household in the county was $25,757, and the median income for a family was $30,324. Males had a median income of $28,266 versus $20,223 for females. The per capita income for the county was $13,430.  About 24.90% of families and 29.20% of the population were below the poverty line, including 38.40% of those under age 18 and 24.60% of those age 65 or over.

Washington County's demographics are rooted in the region's mid-nineteenth-century ascendance in cotton production and, accordingly, importation of people as slaves. According to the historian Sven Beckert, the county had "more than ten slaves for every white inhabitant" in 1840, and "every white family in the county held on average more than eighty slaves" by 1850.

1990 census 
As of the census of 1990, there were 67,935 people living in the county. The racial makeup of the county was 57.46% (39,035) Black or African American, 41.47% (28,174) White, 0.08% (53) Native American, 0.36% (244) Asian, and 0.02% (13) from other races. 0.61% (416) were Hispanic or Latino of any race.

Transportation

Major highways
  U.S. Highway 82
  U.S. Highway 61
  U.S. Highway 278
  Mississippi Highway 1
  Mississippi Highway 12

Airport
Mid Delta Regional Airport, owned by the City of Greenville, is located in an unincorporated area in the county.

Education
 Public School Districts
 Greenville Public School District
 Leland School District
 Hollandale School District
 Western Line School District
 Private Schools
 Deer Creek School (Arcola)
 Greenville Christian School
 Saint Joseph Catholic High School (Greenville)
 Washington School (Greenville)

Pillow Academy in unincorporated Leflore County, near Greenwood, enrolls some students from Washington County. It originally was a segregation academy.

Communities

Cities
 Greenville (third and current county seat)
 Hollandale
 Leland

Towns
 Arcola
 Metcalfe

Census-designated places
 Elizabeth
 Glen Allan
 Stoneville
 Winterville

Unincorporated communities

 Avon
 Burdett
 Chatham
 Darlove
 Erwin
 Foote
 McCutcheon
 Murphy
 Percy
 Refuge
 Tralake
 Tribbett
 Wayside
 Wilmot

Ghost towns
 New Mexico (first county seat)
 Port Anderson
 Princeton (second county seat)

Politics

See also

 National Register of Historic Places listings in Washington County, Mississippi

Footnotes

Further reading
 Russell S. Hall, Princella W. Nowell, and Stacy Childress, Washington County, Mississippi. Charleston, SC: Arcadia Publishing, 2000.
 Bern Keating, A History of Washington County, Mississippi. Greenville, MS: Greenville Junior Auxiliary, 1976.
 John L. McCoy, Factors Associated with Level-of-Living in Washington County, Mississippi. US Department of Agriculture Technical Bulletin no. 1501. Washington, DC: US Dept. of Agriculture, Economic Research Service, 1974.
 William Bert Thompson, A History of the Greenville, Mississippi, Public Schools under the Administration of E.E. Bass, 1884-1932. MA thesis. University, MS: University of Mississippi, 1968.

 
Mississippi counties
1827 establishments in Mississippi
Populated places established in 1827
Mississippi counties on the Mississippi River
Black Belt (U.S. region)
Majority-minority counties in Mississippi